The following is a list of state highways in the U.S. state of Louisiana designated in the 1150–1199 range.

All are owned and maintained by the Louisiana Department of Transportation and Development (La DOTD) and were designated in the 1955 Louisiana Highway renumbering.  All but four of the routes on this list are proposed for deletion as part of La DOTD's Road Transfer Program.


Louisiana Highway 1150

Louisiana Highway 1150 (LA 1150) runs  in an east–west direction along 6th Avenue from 10th Street to US 165 in Kinder.  It is currently proposed for deletion as part of La DOTD's Road Transfer program.

Louisiana Highway 1151

Louisiana Highway 1151 (LA 1151) runs  in an east–west direction from the intersection of two local roads southwest of Oberlin to a junction with LA 26 in Oberlin.  It is currently proposed for deletion as part of La DOTD's Road Transfer program.

Louisiana Highway 1152

Louisiana Highway 1152 (LA 1152) runs  in a north–south direction in a loop off of US 165 in Oakdale.  It is currently proposed for deletion as part of La DOTD's Road Transfer program.

Louisiana Highway 1153

Louisiana Highway 1153 (LA 1153) runs  in a north–south direction from US 165 in Oakdale to a second junction with US 165 at Pawnee.  It is currently proposed for deletion as part of La DOTD's Road Transfer program.

Louisiana Highway 1154

Louisiana Highway 1154 (LA 1154) ran  in a north–south direction from LA 1153 to a local road at the Allen–Rapides parish line west of Pawnee.  The route was transferred to local control in 1969.

Louisiana Highway 1155

Louisiana Highway 1155 (LA 1155) ran  in a north–south direction from a local road southwest of Mittie to a junction with LA 26 west of Mittie.  It was transferred to local control in 1977.

Louisiana Highway 1156

Louisiana Highway 1156 (LA 1156) runs  in a northwest to southeast direction from LA 112 in Elizabeth to a point on Bay City Road south of town.  It is currently proposed for deletion as part of La DOTD's Road Transfer program.

Louisiana Highway 1157

Louisiana Highway 1157 (LA 1157) consists of two road segments with a total length of  that are located in the Evangeline Parish town of Basile.  Both segments are currently proposed for deletion as part of La DOTD's Road Transfer program.

LA 1157-1 spans  along Stagg Avenue and its extension from Wilburton Lane west of Basile to LA 3277 at Fusilier Avenue within the town limits.
LA 1157-2 spans  along Martin Luther King Avenue and Green Street from US 190 on the Evangeline–Acadia parish line to LA 1157-1 (West Stagg Avenue).

Louisiana Highway 1158

Louisiana Highway 1158 (LA 1158) runs  in a north–south direction from LA 3277 to the intersection of two local roads north of Basile.  It is currently proposed for deletion as part of La DOTD's Road Transfer program.

Louisiana Highway 1159

Louisiana Highway 1159 (LA 1159) runs  in an east–west direction along Aguillard Road from LA 1158 to a point beyond Ruby Road north of Basile.  It is currently proposed for deletion as part of La DOTD's Road Transfer program.

Louisiana Highway 1160

Louisiana Highway 1160 (LA 1160) runs  in an east–west direction from the intersection of two local roads west of Mamou to the junction of LA 104 and LA 3149 in Mamou.  It is currently proposed for deletion as part of La DOTD's Road Transfer program.

Louisiana Highway 1161

Louisiana Highway 1161 (LA 1161) runs  in an east–west direction along Pine Point Road from LA 104 east of Mamou to LA 29 south of Ville Platte.

Louisiana Highway 1162

Louisiana Highway 1162 (LA 1162) runs  in a northeast to southwest direction from a local road to a junction with LA 29 southwest of Chataignier.  The route's mileposts increase from the northern or eastern end contrary to common practice.  It is currently proposed for deletion as part of La DOTD's Road Transfer program.

Louisiana Highway 1163

Louisiana Highway 1163 (LA 1163) runs  in a north–south direction from the concurrent LA 29 and LA 95 in Chataignier to LA 104 in Point Blue.  It is currently proposed for deletion as part of La DOTD's Road Transfer program.

Louisiana Highway 1164

Louisiana Highway 1164 (LA 1164) runs  in an east–west direction along Regal Road from LA 1163 to LA 29 north of Chataignier.  It is currently proposed for deletion as part of La DOTD's Road Transfer program.

Louisiana Highway 1165

Louisiana Highway 1165 (LA 1165) runs  in a southwest to northeast direction along L'Anse Aux Pailles Road from LA 29 to LA 104 northeast of Chataignier.  It is currently proposed for deletion as part of La DOTD's Road Transfer program.

Louisiana Highway 1166

Louisiana Highway 1166 (LA 1166) runs  in a north–south direction from LA 1165 to LA 104 northeast of Chataignier.  It is currently proposed for deletion as part of La DOTD's Road Transfer program.

Louisiana Highway 1167

Louisiana Highway 1167 (LA 1167) runs  in an east–west direction along L'Anse De Cavailer Road from LA 104 to a point near Batier Road northeast of Chataignier.  It is currently proposed for deletion as part of La DOTD's Road Transfer program.

Louisiana Highway 1168

Louisiana Highway 1168 (LA 1168) runs  in a northwest to southeast direction along Belaire Cove Road from the concurrent US 167 and LA 10 in Ville Platte to a local road at the Evangeline–St. Landry parish line southeast of Ville Platte.  It is currently proposed for deletion as part of La DOTD's Road Transfer program.

Louisiana Highway 1169

Louisiana Highway 1169 (LA 1169) runs  in a north–south direction along P Z Road from LA 748 to LA 363 east of Ville Platte.  It is currently proposed for deletion as part of La DOTD's Road Transfer program.

Louisiana Highway 1170

Louisiana Highway 1170 (LA 1170) ran  in a north–south direction from LA 363 to LA 29 northeast of Ville Platte.  The route became part of LA 29 in 1988.

Louisiana Highway 1171

Louisiana Highway 1171 (LA 1171) runs  in a north–south direction along Tate Cove Road from LA 29 in Ville Platte to a point north of Tate Cove.  It is currently proposed for deletion as part of La DOTD's Road Transfer program.

Louisiana Highway 1172

Louisiana Highway 1172 (LA 1172) runs  in a general north–south direction along Heritage Road from LA 376 north of Vidrine to LA 13 south of Pine Prairie.  It is currently proposed for deletion as part of La DOTD's Road Transfer program.

Louisiana Highway 1173

Louisiana Highway 1173 (LA 1173) ran  in a north–south direction from a dead end at Lake Chicot to a junction with LA 106 west of St. Landry.  The route served as an access road to Lake Chicot State Park and was transferred to local control in 2002.

Louisiana Highway 1174

Louisiana Highway 1174 (LA 1174) runs  in an east–west direction between two junctions with LA 29 and LA 95 in Chataignier.  It is currently proposed for deletion as part of La DOTD's Road Transfer program.

Louisiana Highway 1175

Louisiana Highway 1175 (LA 1175) runs  in an east–west direction from LA 29 west of Gold Dust to a local road in Gold Dust.  It is currently proposed for deletion as part of La DOTD's Road Transfer program.

Louisiana Highway 1176

Louisiana Highway 1176 (LA 1176) runs  in a general east–west direction from LA 115 west of Bunkie to US 71 southeast of Bunkie.

Louisiana Highway 1177

Louisiana Highway 1177 (LA 1177) runs  in a northwest to southeast direction from US 71 northwest of Bunkie to a second junction with US 71 in Bunkie.  It is currently proposed for deletion as part of La DOTD's Road Transfer program.

Louisiana Highway 1178

Louisiana Highway 1178 (LA 1178) runs  in a north–south direction from US 71 northwest of Morrow to LA 29 in Evergreen.

Louisiana Highway 1179

Louisiana Highway 1179 (LA 1179) runs  in a general east–west direction from LA 107 southwest of Plaucheville to a second junction with LA 107 southeast of Plaucheville.  It is currently proposed for deletion as part of La DOTD's Road Transfer program.

Louisiana Highway 1180

Louisiana Highway 1180 (LA 1180) runs  in a general north–south direction from a local road south of Bodoc to LA 107 south of Plaucheville.  It is currently proposed for deletion as part of La DOTD's Road Transfer program.

Louisiana Highway 1181

Louisiana Highway 1181 (LA 1181) runs  in a general east–west direction from LA 107 in Plaucheville to a local road east of Plaucheville.  It is currently proposed for deletion as part of La DOTD's Road Transfer program.

Louisiana Highway 1182

Louisiana Highway 1182 (LA 1182) runs  in a loop off of LA 1181 northeast of Plaucheville.  It is currently proposed for deletion as part of La DOTD's Road Transfer program.

Louisiana Highway 1183

Louisiana Highway 1183 (LA 1183) runs  in a north–south direction from LA 105 in Odenburg to LA 1 west of Simmesport.  It is currently proposed for deletion as part of La DOTD's Road Transfer program.

Louisiana Highway 1184

Louisiana Highway 1184 (LA 1184) runs  in a loop off of LA 29 west of Cottonport.  It is currently proposed for deletion as part of La DOTD's Road Transfer program.

Louisiana Highway 1185

Louisiana Highway 1185 (LA 1185) runs  in a southwest to northeast direction from LA 107 north of Cottonport to LA 114 southeast of Mansura.  It is currently proposed for deletion as part of La DOTD's Road Transfer program.

Louisiana Highway 1186

Louisiana Highway 1186 (LA 1186) runs  in an east–west direction from LA 114 in Mansura to LA 1 east of Mansura.  It is currently proposed for deletion as part of La DOTD's Road Transfer program.

Louisiana Highway 1187

Louisiana Highway 1187 (LA 1187) runs  in a loop off of LA 114 west of Mansura.  The route's mileposts increase from the eastern end contrary to common practice.  It is currently proposed for deletion as part of La DOTD's Road Transfer program.

Louisiana Highway 1188

Louisiana Highway 1188 (LA 1188) runs  in a north–south direction from LA 115 southwest of Hessmer to LA 114 west of Hessmer.  It is currently proposed for deletion as part of La DOTD's Road Transfer program.

Louisiana Highway 1189

Louisiana Highway 1189 (LA 1189) runs  in an east–west direction along Acton Road from LA 115 to LA 452 in Marksville.  It is currently proposed for deletion as part of La DOTD's Road Transfer program.

Louisiana Highway 1190

Louisiana Highway 1190 (LA 1190) runs  in an east–west direction along Spring Bayou Road from the concurrent LA 107 and LA 115 in Marksville to Little River Road east of Marksville.  Except for the portion west of LA 452, it is currently proposed for deletion as part of La DOTD's Road Transfer program.

Louisiana Highway 1191

Louisiana Highway 1191 (LA 1191) runs  in an east–west direction from LA 1 to the concurrent LA 107 and LA 115 north of Marksville.  It is currently proposed for deletion as part of La DOTD's Road Transfer program.

Louisiana Highway 1192

Louisiana Highway 1192 (LA 1192) runs  in a general east–west direction from LA 1 northwest of Marksville to the concurrent LA 107/LA 115 in Marksville.  It is currently proposed for deletion as part of La DOTD's Road Transfer program.

Louisiana Highway 1193

Louisiana Highway 1193 (LA 1193) runs  in an east–west direction from LA 453 to the concurrent LA 107 and LA 115 northwest of Marksville.  It is currently proposed for deletion as part of La DOTD's Road Transfer program.

Louisiana Highway 1194

Louisiana Highway 1194 (LA 1194) runs  in a general east–west direction from LA 1 in Fifth Ward to the intersection of two local roads southeast of Fifth Ward.  The route has a spur that travels  along Schoolhouse Road from LA 1 to LA 1194 in Fifth Ward.  Both LA 1194 and its spur are currently proposed for deletion as part of La DOTD's Road Transfer program.

Louisiana Highway 1195

Louisiana Highway 1195 (LA 1195) runs  in a southeast to northwest direction from LA 1 to the intersection of two local roads north of Fifth Ward.  It is currently proposed for deletion as part of La DOTD's Road Transfer program.

Louisiana Highway 1196

Louisiana Highway 1196 (LA 1196) runs  in an east–west direction from the concurrent LA 107 and LA 115 in Effie to a local road in Dunlap.  It is currently proposed to be extended northeast for approximately  along existing local roads to a connection with LA 3102 in southern Catahoula Parish.

Louisiana Highway 1197

Louisiana Highway 1197 (LA 1197) ran  in a north–south direction from the concurrent LA 107 and LA 115 in Effie to a local road north of Effie.  The route was transferred to local control by 1958.

Louisiana Highway 1198

Louisiana Highway 1198 (LA 1198) runs  in a north–south direction along Hathorne Road from LA 1 at Richland to LA 457 north of Richland.  It is currently proposed for deletion as part of La DOTD's Road Transfer program.

Louisiana Highway 1199

Louisiana Highway 1199 (LA 1199) runs  in a north–south direction from LA 112 in Elmer to LA 121 in Otis.  It is currently proposed for deletion as part of La DOTD's Road Transfer program.

See also

References

Footnotes

Works cited

External links
Maps / GIS Data Homepage, Louisiana Department of Transportation and Development